Bucklin is a city in Ford County, Kansas, United States.  As of the 2020 census, the population of the city was 727.

History
The community was originally called Corbitt when it was laid out about 1885. It was renamed Bucklin in 1887, after Bucklin Township.

Bucklin was incorporated in 1909. It was situated at the junction of two railroads.

Geography
Bucklin is located at  (37.547942, -99.635001).

Climate
The climate in this area is characterized by hot, humid summers and generally mild to cool winters.  According to the Köppen Climate Classification system, Bucklin has a humid subtropical climate, abbreviated "Cfa" on climate maps.

Demographics

2010 census
As of the census of 2010, there were 794 people, 287 households, and 204 families residing in the city. The racial makeup of the city was 93.3% White, 1.9% African American, 0.9% Native American, 0.3% Asian, 1.0% from other races, and 2.6% from two or more races. Hispanic or Latino of any race were 4.0% of the population.

There were 287 households, of which 39.0% had children under the age of 18 living with them, 56.8% were married couples living together, 10.5% had a female householder with no husband present, 3.8% had a male householder with no wife present, and 28.9% were non-families. 25.4% of all households were made up of individuals, and 11.8% had someone living alone who was 65 years of age or older. The average household size was 2.64 and the average family size was 3.17.

The median age in the city was 35 years. 30.4% of residents were under the age of 18; 6.4% were between the ages of 18 and 24; 23.4% were from 25 to 44; 22.5% were from 45 to 64; and 17.3% were 65 years of age or older. The gender makeup of the city was 49.1% male and 50.9% female.

2000 census

As of the census of 2000, there were 725 people, 299 households, and 200 families residing in the city. The racial makeup of the city was 95.03% White, 0.41% African American, 0.69% Native American, 0.41% Asian, 1.52% from other races, and 1.93% from two or more races. Hispanic or Latino of any race were 4.00% of the population.

There were 299 households, out of which 34.8% had children under the age of 18 living with them, 56.5% were married couples living together, 7.4% had a female householder with no husband present, and 32.8% were non-families. 29.8% of all households were made up of individuals, and 16.1% had someone living alone who was 65 years of age or older. The average household size was 2.42 and the average family size was 2.99.

In the city, the population was spread out, with 28.4% under the age of 18, 7.9% from 18 to 24, 25.1% from 25 to 44, 21.8% from 45 to 64, and 16.8% who were 65 years of age or older. The median age was 38 years. For every 100 females, there were 96.5 males. For every 100 females age 18 and over, there were 93.7 males.

The median income for a household in the city was $38,750, and the median income for a family was $44,554. Males had a median income of $31,667 versus $18,235 for females. The per capita income for the city was $17,954. About 6.8% of families and 8.0% of the population were below the poverty line, including 10.3% of those under age 18 and 7.4% of those age 65 or over.

Education
The community is served by Bucklin USD 459 public school district.

The Bucklin Red Aces won the following Kansas State High School championships:
 1966 Boys Cross Country - Class B  
 1973 Boys Track & Field - Class 1A 
 1973 Boys Track & Field (Indoor) - Class 1A 
 1980 Boys Track & Field - Class 1A

Notable people
 Eddie Sutton, men's college basketball coach

References

Further reading

 Living in the Depot: The Two-Story Railroad Station; H. Roger Grant; University of Iowa Press; 130 pages; 1993; .  Contains historic images of Kansas stations at Alta Vista, Bucklin, Comiskey, Haddam, Hoyt, and Wakarusa.

External links
 City of Bucklin
 Bucklin - Directory of Public Officials
 USD 459, local school district
 Bucklin City Map, KDOT

Cities in Kansas
Cities in Ford County, Kansas
1885 establishments in Kansas
Populated places established in 1885